Culture change is a term used in public policy making that emphasizes the influence of cultural capital on individual and community behavior. It has been sometimes called repositioning of culture, which means the reconstruction of the cultural concept of a society. It places stress on the social and cultural capital determinants of decision making and the manner in which these interact with other factors like the availability of information or the financial incentives facing individuals to drive behavior.
 

These cultural capital influences include the role of parenting, families and close associates; organizations such as schools and workplaces; communities and neighborhoods; and wider social influences such as the media. It is argued that this cultural capital manifests into specific values, attitudes or social norms which in turn guide the behavioral intentions that individuals adopt in regard to particular decisions or courses of action. These behavioral intentions interact with other factors driving behavior such as financial incentives, regulation and legislation, or levels of information, to drive actual behavior and ultimately feed back into underlying cultural capital.

In general, cultural stereotypes present great resistance to change and to their own redefinition. Culture, often appears fixed to the observer at any one point in time because cultural mutations occur incrementally. Cultural change is a long-term process. Policymakers need to make a great effort to improve some basics aspects of a society’s cultural traits.

Culture

Raimon Panikkar identified 29 ways in which cultural change can be brought about, including growth, development, evolution, involution, renovation, reconception, reform, innovation, revivalism, revolution, mutation, progress, diffusion, osmosis, borrowing, eclecticism, syncretism, modernization, indigenization, and transformation. In this context, modernization could be viewed as adoption of Enlightenment era beliefs and practices, such as science, rationalism, industry, commerce, democracy, and the notion of progress. Rein Raud, building on the work of Umberto Eco, Pierre Bourdieu and Jeffrey C. Alexander, has proposed a model of cultural change based on claims and bids, which are judged by their cognitive adequacy and endorsed or not endorsed by the symbolic authority of the cultural community in question.

Cultural invention

Cultural invention has come to mean any innovation that is new and found to be useful to a group of people and expressed in their behavior but which does not exist as a physical object. Humanity is in a global "accelerating culture change period," driven by the expansion of international commerce, the mass media, and above all, the human population explosion, among other factors. Culture repositioning means the reconstruction of the cultural concept of a society.

Cultures are internally affected by both forces encouraging change and forces resisting change. These forces are related to both social structures and natural events, and are involved in the perpetuation of cultural ideas and practices within current structures, which themselves are subject to change. (See structuration.)

Social conflict
Social conflict and the development of technologies can produce changes within a society by altering social dynamics and promoting new cultural models, and spurring or enabling generative action. These social shifts may accompany ideological shifts and other types of cultural change. For example, the U.S. feminist movement involved new practices that produced a shift in gender relations, altering both gender and economic structures. Environmental conditions may also enter as factors. For example, after tropical forests returned at the end of the last ice age, plants suitable for domestication were available, leading to the invention of agriculture, which in turn brought about many cultural innovations and shifts in social dynamics.

Diffusion
Cultures are externally affected via contact between societies, which may also produce—or inhibit—social shifts and changes in cultural practices. War or competition over resources may impact technological development or social dynamics. Additionally, cultural ideas may transfer from one society to another, through diffusion or acculturation. In diffusion, the form of something (though not necessarily its meaning) moves from one culture to another. For example, Western restaurant chains and culinary brands sparked curiosity and fascination to the Chinese as China opened its economy to international trade in the late 20th-century. "Stimulus diffusion" (the sharing of ideas) refers to an element of one culture leading to an invention or propagation in another. "Direct borrowing," on the other hand, tends to refer to technological or tangible diffusion from one culture to another. Diffusion of innovations theory presents a research-based model of why and when individuals and cultures adopt new ideas, practices, and products.

Acculturation
Acculturation has different meanings. Still, in this context, it refers to the replacement of traits of one culture with another, such as what happened to certain Native American tribes and many indigenous peoples across the globe during the process of colonization. Related processes on an individual level include assimilation (adoption of a different culture by an individual) and transculturation. The transnational flow of culture has played a major role in merging different cultures and sharing thoughts, ideas, and beliefs.

Achieving culture change
The term is used by Knott et al. of the Prime Minister's Strategy Unit in the publication: Achieving Culture Change: A Policy Framework (Knott et al., 2008). The paper sets out how public policy can achieve social and cultural change through 'downstream' interventions including fiscal incentives, legislation, regulation and information provision and also 'upstream' interventions such as parenting, peer and mentoring programs, or development of social and community networks.

The key concepts the paper is based on include:
 Cultural capital - such as the attitudes, values, aspirations and sense of self-efficacy which influence behavior. Cultural capital is itself influenced by behavior over time
 The shifting social zeitgeist - whereby social norms and values that predominate within the cultural capital in society evolve in over time
 The process by which political narrative and new ideas and innovations shift the social zeitgeist over time within the constraint of the 'elastic band' of public opinion
 The process of behavioral normalization - whereby behavior and actions pass through into social and cultural norms (for example, Knott et al. argue that the UK experience of seat belt enforcement established and reinforced this as a social norm)
 The use of customer insight
 The importance of tailoring policy programmes around an ecological model of human behavior to account for how policy will interact with cultural capital and affect it over time.

Knott et al. use examples from a range of policy areas to demonstrate how the culture change framework can be applied to policymaking. for example:
 To encourage educational aspiration they recommend more use of early years and parenting interventions, an improved childhood offer, and development of positive narratives on education as well as integrated advisory systems, financial assistance and targeted social marketing approaches.
 To promote healthy living and personal responsibility they recommend building healthy living into community infrastructure, building partnerships with schools and employers, more one-to-one support for wellbeing alongside use of regulation and legislation on unhealthy products, provision of robust health information and health marketing to promote adaptive forms of behaviour.
 To develop environmentally sustainable norms they recommend reinforcing sustainability throughout policy narratives, using schools and the voluntary sector to promote environmental messages, development of infrastructure that make sustainable choices easy, together with a wider package of measures on fiscal incentives, regulation, advisory services and coalition movements.

See also 

 Behavioural economics
 Cultural economics
 Cultural geography
 Cultural psychology
 Social psychology
 Cultural capital
 Market failure
 Mediatization (media)
 Social change
 Sociocultural evolution
 Theory of planned behavior

Notes

References 
 Groh, Arnold (2019). Theories of Culture. London: Routledge, . 
 Knott, David; Muers, Stephen; Aldridge, Stephen (2008). 
 GSR Behaviour Change Knowledge Review (2008). Reference Report: An overview of behaviour change models and their uses

External links 
 Baconbutty on Culture Change
 Cut crime with drink tax, Gordon Brown told, Daily Telegraph
 The naughty nation, New Statesman 
 Winning Hearts and Minds 
 Transformer une culture : un cadre d’action pour les politiques publiques  (in French)
 Leading Teams on Culture Change 

Culture
Policy
Change
Social psychology
Cultural geography
Cultural economics